Sambo may refer to:

Places
 Sambo, Angola, a commune in Tchicala Tcholohanga, Huambo Province, Angola

 Sambo Creek, a village in Honduras

People
 Khem Sambo (1961–2011), Cambodian journalist
 Luís Gomes Sambo, Angolan physician and politician who served as director of the African regional office of the World Health Organization
 Sambo, botanist author abbreviation for Maria Cengia Sambo (1888–1939), Italian lichenologist
 The nickname of Terence McNaughton (1965), Irish hurler
 Ferdy Sambo (born 1973), Former Indonesian police general
 Shurandy Sambo (born 2001), Dutch footballer

Other uses
 Sambo, the title character of the 1899 book The Story of Little Black Sambo by Helen Bannerman
 Sambo, the title character of the 1935 film Little Black Sambo, based on the 1899 book
Sambo (martial art), developed in the Soviet Union
 Sambo (mountain), in the Andes of Peru
 Sambo (racial term), a derogatory term for a person of Indian or African origin
 Zambo, a Spanish term possibly related to "Sambo"
 Sambo's, a former American restaurant chain
 Sambo's Grave, grave of a slave (died 1736) at Sunderland Point in Lancashire, England

See also
 Samba, an Afro-Brazilian dancing/music style
 Sambomaster, a Japanese rock band
 Sambu (disambiguation)
 Shambo a black Friesian bull living in the Hindu Skanda Vale Temple near Llanpumsaint in Wales (2001–2007)
 Shambo Shiva Shambo or Sambo Shiva Sambo, a 2010 Telugu film